is a 2010 anime film. It is the fifth film based on the popular comedy manga and anime series Keroro Gunso.

The film was released in theatres on February 27, 2010 in Japan. It was produced by Sunrise, the studio behind the TV anime.

Plot
Fuyuki Hinata, has a dream that one day the world will be destroyed by an unknown threat. The Hinata household is attacked and the entire keroro squad is entombed in stone, with Keroro Gunsou being killed. Fuyuki is seen walking around an empty black space. But what he does see is a burning ship crashing from the sky and when he turns around the Keroro platoon (minus Keroro) is frozen in stone. The Main character wakes up from the nightmare, to find himself alone in his living room. The character Alisa Southerncross then comes and throws an artifact at him, which causes Fuyuki to stumble off the couch. Fuyuki greets Alisa, and notes that the Artifact looks like Keroro Gunsou. Then both hypothesize that the statue comes from Easter Island, which appears as an important location several times in the previous stories, due to visual similarities it has with the other statues there. Then the house floods with water, as a comedy break, promptly followed by Natsumi Hinata, Fuyuki’s sister, yelling at them and telling them to clean it up. Fuyuki explains to Keroro about the statue and its relation to the “Moai” statues at Easter Island. The sergeant (Keroro) shrugs this off as Fuyuki talking about another character that goes by Angol Mois. The Sergeant sees this as a challenge, and decides him and his platoon are going to conquer the Easter Island. They go to Easter Island, and during the trip there, they encounter a storm and crash down onto the island. They wake up later and find themselves to be in captivity of the local peoples of Easter Island.  The rest of the Keroro platoon search for the missing Sergeant and Fuyuki, as an enemy known as AkuAku is trying to exterminate all human kind, With the Sergeant and Fuyuki trying to find a way home.  Fuyuki wakes up and meets Lo and Rana who are trying to cook the sgt. They both have a joyful reunion and learn about Kanini. Giroro and Kululu find out about Fuyuki and Keroro sneaking out to the island and decide to get Dororo and Tamama because AkuAku has been making trouble and they might be endanger.

Cast of characters
 Kumiko Watanabe—Sgt. Keroro
 Houko Kuwashima—Fuyuki Hinata
 Akiko Yajima—Alisa Southercross
 Chiwa Saito—Natsumi Hinata
 Etsuko Kozakura—Tamama
 Jouji Nakata—Giroro
 Mamiko Noto—Angol Mois
 Shigeru Chiba—Akuaku
 Takehito Koyasu—Kururu
 Takeshi Kusao—Dororo
 Tamaki Matsumoto—Rana
 Yûtarô Honjô—Io
 Akiko Hiramatsu—Aki Hinata
 Akira Ishida—Saburo
 Haruna Ikezawa—Momoka Nishizawa
 Ryou Hirohashi—Koyuki Azumaya
 Keiji Fujiwara—Narrator, Paul Moriyama

Reception
The film debuted in the Japanese box office sixth, earning US$662,651 on 144 screens. It was the 13th most watched anime film of the first of half of 2010 in Japan.

References

External links 
  
 

2010 anime films
Sgt. Frog films
Films set in Easter Island
Films set in Chile